The Simon and Mamie Minchen House is a single-family residence in the Ormond Place subdivision in Boulevard Oaks, Houston. It is listed on the National Register of Historic Places, #00001496, as of December 7, 2000. It is also a Recorded Texas Historic Landmark and a Protected Houston Landmark. The two-story house uses an Italian Renaissance architectural style, and it also has a garage of the same height, which can hold three cars. The property also has a residence formerly used for servants.

Joseph Finger designed the house, built in 1931, and it had been held in the Minchen family for generations. It was put up for sale for $2.2 million in 2018.

See also

National Register of Historic Places listings in inner Harris County, Texas
Recorded Texas Historic Landmarks in Harris County

References

External links

National Register of Historic Places in Texas
Houses in Houston